Australia at the 2002 Commonwealth Games was represented by a team selected by the Australian Commonwealth Games Association (ACGA) and abbreviated AUS.

Australia officially became a member of the Commonwealth of Nations in 1931 under the Statute of Westminster having become independent of the UK in 1901.

Australia is one of only six countries to have competed in all of the Commonwealth Games held since 1930, although they did attend the 1911 Inter-Empire Championships as part of an Australasian team. This impressive international record extends to its participation in every Olympic Games in the modern era.

At the first Games in 1930 Australia won only 8 medals against England's 61. However, by the first Games of the 21st century held in the city of Manchester, Australia's medal tally had moved to 207, ahead of any other country including England's 165.

Medals

| style="text-align:left; width:78%; vertical-align:top;"|

| width="22%" align="left" valign="top" |

Results by event

Athletics
Women's 100 Metres
 Lauren Hewitt – 5th in Semi Final 2, 11.45 s

Women's 100 Metres Hurdles
 Jacquie Munro – 7th in Final, 13.31 s
 Fiona Cullen – 6th in Heat 1, 13.45 s

Women's 200 Metres
 Lauren Hewitt – Bronze, 22.69 s
 Sharon Cripps – 7th in Final 23.04 s

Men's 400 Metres
 Clinton Hill – 8th in Final, 46.00 s

Women's 400 Metres Hurdles
 Jana Pittman – Gold, 54.40 s
 Sonia Brito – 5th in Final, 57.79 s

Men's 800 Metres
 Kris McCarthy – Bronze, 1 min 46.79 s

Women's 800 Metres
 Tamsyn Lewis – 5th in Final, 1 min 59.73 s

Men's 1500 Metres
 Youcef Abdi – Bronze, 3 min 37.77 s

Women's 1500 Metres
 Sarah Jamieson – 5th in Final, 4 min 9.38 s
 Benita Johnson – 7th in Heat 1, 4 min 24.43 s

Men's 5 000 Metres
 Craig Mottram – 6th, 13 min 25.21 s
 Michael Power – 8th, 13 min 34.04 s

Women's 5 000 Metres
 Benita Johnson – 6th, 15 min 26.55 s
 Anna Thompson – 9th, 15 min 43.92 s
 Haley McGregor – 11th, 15 min 47.10 s

Men's 10 000 Metres
 Sisay Bezabeh – 9th, 28 min 37.12 s
 Dean Cavuoto – 16th, 29 min 18.38 s
 Brett Cartwright – 18th, 29 min 21.29 s

Women's 10 000 Metres
 Susie Power – Bronze, 31 min 32.20 s
 Kerryn McCann – Did Not Start

Men's Marathon
 Andrew Letherby – Bronze, 2 hours 13 min 23 s
 Lee Troop – 7th, 2 hours 16 min 44 s
 Shaun Creighton – 9th, 2 hours 18 min 19 s

Women's Marathon
 Kerryn McCann – Gold, 2 hours 30 mins5 s
 Krishna Stanton – Silver, 2 hours 34 min 52 s
 Jackie Gallagher – Bronze, 2 hours 36 min 37 s

Men's 4 x 100 Metres Relay
 Australia – Bronze, 38.87 s
 David Baxter
 Patrick Johnson
 Paul Di Bella
 Tim Williams

Women's 4 x 100 Metres Relay
 Australia – 4th in Final, 43.72 s
 Jodi Lambert
 Lauren Hewitt
 Melanie Kleeberg
 Sharon Cripps

Men's 4 x 400 Metres Relay
 Australia – 5th in Final, 3 min 2.22 s
 Clinton Hill
 Kris McCarthy
 Patrick "Pat" Dwyer
 Paul Pearce
 Tim Williams

Women's 4 x 400 Metres Relay
 Australia – Gold, 3 min 25.63 s
 Cathy Freeman
 Jana Pittman
 Kylie Wheeler
 Lauren Hewitt
 Tamsyn Lewis

Men's 20 Kilometre Walk
 Nathan Deakes – Gold, 1 hour 25 min 35 s
 Luke Adams – Silver, 1 hour 26 min 3 s

Women's 20 Kilometre Walk
 Jane Kara Saville – Gold, 1 hour 36 min 34 s
 Natalie Saville– 4th, 1 hour 42 min 38 s
 Simone Wolowiec – 5th, 1 hour 43 min 10 s

Men's 50 Kilometre Walk
 Nathan Deakes – Gold, 3 hours 52 min 40 s
 Duane Cousins – 4th, 4 hours 9 min 59 s
 Liam Murphy – Disqualified

Men's Shot Put
 Justin Anlezark – Gold, 20.91 metres
 Clay Cross – 6th, 18.10 metres

Men's Javelin
 William Hamlyn-Harris – 4th, 77.31 metres
 Andrew Currey – 5th, 76.98 metres

Women's Javelin
 Cecillia McIntosh – Silver, 57.42 metres

Men's Hammer Throw
 Stuart Rendell – 4th, 67.51 metres

Women's Hammer Throw
 Bronwyn Eagles – Silver, 65.24 metres
 Karyne di Marco – Bronze, 63.40 metres

Men's Long Jump
 Tim Parravicini – 9th, 7.60 metres

Men's High Jump
 Nick Moroney – 4th, 2.20 metres

Men's Triple Jump
 Andrew Murphy – 7th, 16.37 metres

Men's Pole Vault
 Paul Burgess – Silver, 5.70 metres
 Viktor Chistiakov – Equal 4th, 5.50 metres
 Dmitri Markov – Equal 4th, 5.50 metres

Women's Pole Vault
 Tatiana Grigorieva – Gold, 4.35 metres
 Kym Howe – Silver, 4.15 metres
 Bridgid Isworth – Equal Bronze, 4.10 metres

Women's Heptathlon
 Jane Jamieson – Gold, 6 059 points
 Kylie Wheeler – Silver, 5 962 points

Men's Decathlon
 Matthew McEwen – Silver, 7 685 points

Women's 800 Metres Wheelchair
 Louise Sauvage – Silver, 1 min 53.30 s
 Eliza Jane Stankovic – Bronze, 1 min 54.20 s

Men's 100 Metres EAD
 Paul Harpur – 3rd in Semi Final 1, 12.57 s

Boxing
Men's Bantamweight Division (54 kg)
 Justin Kane – Gold

Men's Welterweight Division (67 kg)
 Daniel Geale – Gold

Men's Middleweight Division (75 kg)
 Paul Miller – Gold

Men's Light Heavyweight Division (81 kg)
 Ben McEachran – Equal Bronze

Cycling
Men's 20 km Scratch Race
 Graeme Brown – Gold, 24 min 14.660 s

Women's 25 km Points Race
 Katherine Bates – Gold, 37 points
 Rochelle Gilmore – Silver, 23 points

Women's 3 000 Metres Individual Pursuit
 Katherine Bates – Silver, 3 min 34.193 s
 Alison Wright – Bronze, 3 min 40.409 s

Men's 30K Points Race
 Mark Renshaw – Silver, 27 points

Men's 4 000 Metres Individual Pursuit
 Bradley "Brad" McGee – Gold, 4 min 16.358 s

Men's 4 000 Metres Team Pursuit
 Australia – Gold, 3 min 59.583 s
Graeme Brown
Luke Roberts
Mark Renshaw
Peter Dawson
Stephen Wooldridge

Women's 500 Metres Time Trial
 Kerrie Meares – Gold, 35.084 s

Women's Cross Country (Mountain Bike)
 Mary Grigson – Bronze, 1 hour 32 min 49 s

Men's Road Race (187.2 km)
 Stuart O'Grady – Gold, 4 hours 43 min 17 s
 Cadel Evans – Silver, 4 hours 45 min 25 s
 Baden Cooke – Bronze, 4 hours 45 min 45 s

Men's Road Time Trial (46.8 km)
 Cadel Evans – Gold, 1 hour 53.50 s
 Michael Rogers – Silver, 1 hour 2 min 50.36 s
 Nathan O'Neill – Bronze, 1 hour 3 min 20.69 s

Men's Sprint
 Ryan Bayley – Gold, 10.659 s
 Sean Eadie – Silver, xxx s
 Jobie Dajka – Bronze, xxx s

Aquatics

Swimming
Men

Women

Triathlon

Officials

See also
 Australia at the 2000 Summer Olympics
 Australia at the 2004 Summer Olympics

References

External links
Commonwealth Games Australia Results Database

Nations at the 2002 Commonwealth Games
2002
Commonwealth Games